Lycée François-Ier  may refer to:

 Lycée François-Ier in Le Havre
 Lycée François-Ier (Fontainebleau)
 Lycée François-Ier in Vitry-le-François (school complex).